This is a list of films that have something to do with Easter or have Easter as a significant part of them. For Easter specials of regular TV shows, see the list of Easter television specials.  For films about the Biblical Easter see List of films based on the Bible.

Animated
 Easter Yeggs, a Looney Tunes short starring Bugs Bunny, released June 28, 1947
 Happy Go Ducky, a MGM short starring Tom and Jerry released January 3, 1958                                                  
 Hop, a 2011 Easter-themed live-action and animated comedy film directed by Tim Hill
 Rise of the Guardians, a 2012 DreamWorks Animation 3D animated movie directed by Peter Ramsey
 Springtime with Roo, a 2004 animated film from the Winnie The Pooh franchise
 Funny Little Bunnies, a 1934 Silly Symphony from Disney

Comedy
 Chocolat, a 2000 French comedy-drama film
 Easter Sunday, a 2022 film directed by Jay Chandrasekhar
 Hank and Mike, a 2008 film directed by Matthiew Klinck
 Happy Easter (Joyeuses Pâques), a 1984 French comedy film
 Mallrats, a 1995 comedy film directed by Kevin Smith

Family
 Baby Huey's Great Easter Adventure, a 1998 live-action direct-to-video film directed by Stephen Furst
 North, a 1994 film directed by Rob Reiner

Horror
Beaster Day: Here Comes Peter Cottonhell (2014)
The Being (1983)
 Easter Bunny, Kill! Kill!, a 2006 film written and directed by Chad Ferrin
 Holidays, a 2016 horror-anthology film

Musical
 Easter Parade, a 1948 film directed by Charles Walters

See also
 List of Easter television episodes

References

Lists of films set around holidays